Comollo is an Italian surname  localized in the northern regions of Piedmont and Liguria. There are about one hundred families listed in the Italian phonebook under this surname. It is considered the Piedmontese form of the more common surname Comolli, which is mostly localized in the Lombardy region. The surname Comollo is also present in the United States, with about 50 families.

Etymology
Comollo has an etymology in common with other similar forms of the surname, such as: Comotto, Cometti, Cominetti, Comoglio, Comelli, Comino. According to the Dizionario ragionato dei cognomi (Annotated Dictionary of Surnames) by Frangipane, Comollo is the truncated and endearing form from the proper name Giacomo (Jacob): Gia→como→comollo. It is less probable that it is a toponymic from Como, because there are many similar surnames that maintain the original stem, such as: Giacomino, Giacomelli, Giacomolli, Giacometti, Jacobellis, Jacobacci and so on.

Notable people
Father Giuseppe Comollo, parish priest of Cinzano for many years, in the first half of 1800 
Gustavo Comollo, 1904–2000, an antifascist activist and General of an important Partisan Military Army. He wrote a book of memories about the Partisan guerrilla war.
Luigi Comollo (1817–1839), theology student who was the intimate friend of  Don Bosco. The Saint wrote a well-known biography of him.
Ruffino Comollo (de Comolio) is listed among the major citizens of the town of Cinzano (near Turin) in an historic document of 1468.

See also
Comolli (disambiguation)

Notes

Surnames
Surnames of Italian origin